Koumra (Arabic: قمرة, Qumra) is a town in southern Chad. It is the capital of the region of Mandoul and of the department of Mandoul Oriental. It is the sixth largest town in Chad.

Demographics

References

Populated places in Chad
Mandoul Region